Francis Knyvett McNamara (30 April 1912 – 7 January 1992) was an English cricketer. McNamara was a right-handed batsman who bowled left-arm medium pace. He was born at Mussoorie in the British Raj, and was educated at Marlborough College.

McNamara made a single first-class appearance for the Free Foresters against Cambridge University at Fenner's in 1952. In a match which Cambridge University won by an innings and 89 runs, he made scores of 16 opening the batting in the Free Foresters first-innings, before he was dismissed caught and bowled by John Warr, while in their second-innings he was dismissed for 2 runs by Charles Kenny. This was his only first-class appearance.

He died at Worthing, Sussex on 7 January 1992.

References

External links
Francis McNamara at ESPNcricinfo
Francis McNamara at CricketArchive

1912 births
1992 deaths
People from Mussoorie
People educated at Marlborough College
English cricketers
Free Foresters cricketers
British people in colonial India